The Spring Field Banquet Center in Fullerton, California is a historic building built in Mission/Spanish Revival style.  It was listed in the National Register of Historic Places in 1995.  Originally constructed in 1920 as a Masonic meeting hall, the Freemasons sold the building in 1993, due to declining membership and funds. The current owner completely rehabilitated the building in 1995. The building now houses the Spring Field Banquet Center, a commercial banquet hall and reception center.

See also
National Register of Historic Places listings in Orange County, California

References

Former Masonic buildings in California
Fullerton
Buildings and structures in Fullerton, California
National Register of Historic Places in Orange County, California
Clubhouses on the National Register of Historic Places in California
Tourist attractions in Fullerton, California